Djurgårdens Idrottsförening, also known simply as Djurgårdens IF, is a Swedish professional association football club based in Stockholm. The club is affiliated with Stockholms Fotbollförbund, and plays home games at Tele2 Arena. The club's first team play in Allsvenskan as of 2015, the top league in Swedish football, which takes place from April to October every seasons. Djurgården won its first Swedish title 1912 Svenska Mästerskapet, and most recently repeated this in the 2019 Allsvenskan.

Managers
Information correct as of matches played up until 8 December 2022. Matches include league, Allsvenskan play-offs, Svenska Cupen, European matches, and Royal League.

References

 
Managers
Djurgardens IF